Sina Dam, is an earthfill dam on Sina river near Karjat in Ahmednagar district in the state of Maharashtra in India.

Specifications

Purpose
 Irrigation

See also
 Dams in Maharashtra
 List of reservoirs and dams in India

References

Dams in Ahmednagar district
Dams completed in 1986
Earth-filled dams
1986 establishments in Maharashtra